Sommet Morin Heights is an all-year outdoor resort located in the Laurentians, more specifically in Morin Heights, Quebec. The resort, which is part of Mont Saint-Sauveur International, is equipped with the installations necessary to practice many types of activities, such as alpine skiing, cross country skiing, and snowboarding during the cold season, as well as mountain biking, zip lining, camping, and playing tennis during the warm season months.

Activities
The list of available activities at Ski Morin-Heights changes with seasons. During the summer, mountain biking, camping, cabin lodging, zip lining, tennis, and swimming are promoted. As for the winter season, downhill skiing, cross-country skiing, and other winter activities such as skating are practiced.

Incidents
In February 2011, a 13-year-old boy from Blainville died after crashing into a tree on the side of the trail. According to witnesses, he lost control over his skis in a trail designed for intermediate-level skiers and headed in the direction of the tree. The accident occurred around 7 p.m., time at which the ambulance arrived to transport the boy to the hospital, where his death was confirmed. This accident, according to a spokesperson of Mont Saint-Sauveur International (MSSI), was the first fatal accident to occur at Ski Morin Heights since the mountain's acquisition by MSSI in 1992.

References

External links
Ski Morin Heights - Official Website

See also
Mont Saint-Sauveur International

Ski areas and resorts in Quebec